Shannon Nobis (born March 20, 1972) is a former American alpine skier who competed in the 1994 Winter Olympics.

External links
 sports-reference.com

1972 births
Living people
American female alpine skiers
Olympic alpine skiers of the United States
Alpine skiers at the 1994 Winter Olympics
Universiade medalists in alpine skiing
People from Park City, Utah
Universiade bronze medalists for the United States
Competitors at the 1993 Winter Universiade
21st-century American women